The C.F. Sauer Company is a cooking products business that makes extracts and other food products. It was founded in 1887 by Conrad Frederick Sauer in Richmond, Virginia, where it maintains its headquarters.

History

The C.F. Sauer Company was founded on October 13, 1887.

In 1929, Sauer purchased Duke's Products Company and thus entered the mayonnaise industry. The recipe for Duke's Mayonnaise has not been altered since it went into production in 1917.

In the 1950s and 1960s, C.F. Sauer Co. introduced Gold Medal spices and purchased Dean Foods (a margarine company). In recent decades, the company also purchased BAMA brand mayonnaise and Spice Hunter brand exotic spices. It was the first spice company to use plastic containers.
Their condiment facility is located in Mauldin, South Carolina (southeast of Greenville). In 1967, the company acquired Alford's Barbecue sauce, a cider vinegar-based sauce, and rebranded it as Sauer's Barbecue Sauce.

They acquired Pleasants Hardware in 1989. However, on December 28, 2015, the C.F. Sauer company informed the employees of Pleasants Hardware that they were no longer interested in owning hardware stores. C.F. Sauer then sold a number of Pleasants' smaller stores to a Do it Best group in Virginia Beach and gave the remaining 100+ employees in the flagship store sixty days' notice (required by law according to the WARN Act) that they would soon be unemployed. On February 27, 2016, the original Pleasants Hardware closed.

In 2011, C.F. Sauer Co. sold its Dean Foods division to a subsidiary of Bunge Limited.
After 132 years of private ownership, The C.F. Sauer Company was acquired in 2019 by Falfurrias Capital Partners of Charlotte, North Carolina.

Headquarters and sign
The present company headquarters building and main factory was opened in 1911 on West Broad Street (at its intersection with Hermitage Road) in Richmond, Virginia, helping to spur development in that area of the city. In 2011, it was listed as a contributing structure to the West Broad Street Industrial and Commercial Historic District, on the National Register of Historic Places.

Adjacent to the main headquarters building is a large advertising sign dating to the early 20th century, illuminated and animated with incandescent light bulbs, for Sauer's vanilla extract. In the 1960s, the sign was relocated to 2018 West Broad Street from an adjacent building demolished for road expansion. It is itself listed a contributing object to the historic district.

References

External links
 

Manufacturing companies based in Richmond, Virginia
1887 establishments in Virginia
American companies established in 1887
Food and drink companies established in 1887
Condiment companies of the United States